FK Vlasina (Serbian Cyrillic: ФК Власина) is a football club based in Vlasotince, Serbia.

History
The club is one of the oldest football clubs in former Yugoslavia. Founded by locals returning from higher education in major European capitals between the two World Wars, FK Vlasina exists since 1920. Symbolically, the club has been a sign of implementation of advanced European ideas in Serbian society. The development of FK Vlasina is directly linked to the social and economical development of the region around Vlasotince in south-eastern Serbia.

Early period
The founder and first president was Vojislav Popović, who brought the first football in the town. Since the foundation of the club football begin to have many enthusiasts among the population. Other clubs were also founded in Vlasotince, but FK Vlasina was always the most representative one. Some clubs such as SK Dečanski and SK Omladina were merged into FK Vlasina. VSK resisted and became the main local rival. The club competed in local leagues and played numerous tournaments having had as opponents some of the major national clubs, and from this period memorable was a 2–0 win over Belgrade´s SK Jugoslavija in one tournament in Niš. With the beginning of the Second World War the competitions in the region were interrompted.

Post-World War II era
In 1946 the sports activities restarted. After not managing it in the previous season, at the end of the season 1956–57 FK Vlasina achieves the promotion to the 4th zone of the Yugoslav Second League. That season was memorable for club supporters that watched the club to rivalise against many clubs that were or would become members of the Yugoslav top league. At the end of that season the Second and lower leagues suffered a series of structural remodelations and FK Vlasina ended placed for the next season into the 3rd national league – zone Niš. Until the 1980s the club competed in regional leagues. In 1987–88 the club wins the South Morava League. Next year Vlasina wins the Serbian League South achieving promotion to the Serbian First League, then a 3rd tier within Yugoslav league system. In their first season they finished 3rd, but in the next one they finished only 17th ending up relegated. During the 1990s the club will mostly play between the 3rd and 4th tiers, however in the late 1990s the youth players of the club achieved a number of regional successes having some good generations of players.

New millennium
In January 2001 the new administration was elected with Jovan Stojanović becoming a president who made investments in the club's infrastructure and stadium. At the end of the 2001–02 season the club lost against FK Car Konstantin in the qualifiers to the Second League of FR Yugoslavia, but they managed to be promoted next season by winning the 2002–03 Serbian League East. They will be playing the next seasons in the Second League and in 2004–05 the club managed to reach the quarter-finals of the Serbia and Montenegro Cup where they were unexpectedly eliminated on penalties by FK Kolubara after eliminating top league clubs such as FK Budućnost Podgorica and Belgrade's FK Rad in the previous rounds. In 2006–07 they reached the 1/8 finals where they lost again on a penalty shoot-out after a 0–0 draw against top league FK Bežanija. Until the season 2007–08 the club successfully competed in the second league but that year they ended relegated to the Serbian League East.

On November 17, 2010 the club celebrated its 90th anniversary with a match against Red Star Belgrade.

Achievements
Serbian League Niš
2002–03

Supporters
The most famous supporters group of FK Vlasina, the Poplaws (named after a flood of the Vlasotince area in the mid eighties) are widely known for creating special effects with fireworks during the matches. For security reasons the stadium activity has been disapproved and forbidden in some periods during the 2000s.

References

External links
 Club story at Vlasotince website.
 Club profile and squad at FSRIS.
 Club page at Srbijasport.

Football clubs in Serbia
Football clubs in Yugoslavia
Association football clubs established in 1920
1920 establishments in Serbia